Paul Sundu (born July 27, 1973 in Womatne) is a Papua New Guinean clergyman and bishop for the Roman Catholic Diocese of Kundiawa. He was appointed bishop in 2021.

References

External links

1973 births
Papua New Guinean Roman Catholic bishops
Roman Catholic bishops of Kundiawa
Living people